The Union Church and School is a historic combination church and school in rural Logan County, Arkansas.  It is located northeast of Paris, on the south side of Union Road at its junction with Clayton Lane.  It is a vernacular single-story L-shaped wood-frame structure, with a gabled roof, weatherboard siding, and a stone foundation.  The right side of the building, a cross-gable section, was built about 1895, and the left portion was built about 1922.  It served the surrounding community as a two-room school until 1948, and as a Presbyterian church until 1958.

The building was listed on the National Register of Historic Places in 2005.

See also
National Register of Historic Places listings in Logan County, Arkansas

References

School buildings on the National Register of Historic Places in Arkansas
Properties of religious function on the National Register of Historic Places in Arkansas
National Register of Historic Places in Logan County, Arkansas
School buildings completed in 1895
Buildings and structures in Paris, Arkansas